Heinrich Theodor Wehle, or Hendrich Božidar Wjela, in Sorbian (7 March 1778 in Förstgen, Görlitz - 1 January 1805, Bautzen) was a German-Sorbian landscape painter and etcher.

Life and work 
His father, Johann Wehle, was a pastor. His mother, Rahel Dorothea, was a daughter of Heinrich Gottlob Rieschke, the financial administrator of Görlitz.

He received his first lessons around 1790, at the local drawing school. Later, he studied with the landscape engraver, Christoph Nathe. As an enthusiastic horseman, he sold many of his works for only a few Thalers, to rent horses at the stables outside Dessau. 

In 1801, at the invitation of Russia's new Tsar, Alexander I, he took a position at the Imperial Academy of Arts. Soon, he received a commission to accompany an expedition to Russia's Asian possessions, led by the naturalist, Count Apollo Mussin-Pushkin, to document the exotic landscapes. They arrived in Georgia in 1802, and continued on to Persia.

As it turned out, he was not sufficiently fit to cope with the rigors of travelling in that area, and was forced to leave the expedition. He decided to return to Germany, but died in Bautzen before reaching his hometown. He was buried in Kreba, next to his father. A street in Bautzen is named after him.

Sources 
Georg Kaspar Nagler: Neues allgemeines Künstler-Lexicon, 1851 (Digitalisat mit Werksverzeichnis)

Alfred Krautz: Die abenteuerliche Reise des Malers Heinrich Theodor Wehle von der Spree bis zum Kaukasus, Domowina-Verlag, Bautzen 1992, 
Christina Bogusz, Marius Winzeler: Im Reich der schönen, wilden Natur. Der Landschaftszeichner Heinrich Theodor Wehle 1778–1805. {exhibition catalogue), Sorbischen Museum Bautzen, Anhaltischen Gemäldegalerie Dessau and the Kulturhistorischen Museum Görlitz, Domowina-Verlag, Bautzen 2005,

External links 

 "In the Wild Kingdom of Nature. Pictures by Heinrich Theodor Wehle from German Museums", exhibition at the Hermitage Museum
 
 More works by Wehle @ ArtNet

1778 births
1805 deaths
German etchers
German landscape painters
Dresden Academy of Fine Arts
People from Görlitz (district)